Shravasti is a constituency of the Uttar Pradesh Legislative Assembly covering the city of Bhinga in the Shravasti district of Uttar Pradesh, India.

Shravasti is one of five assembly constituencies in the Shravasti Lok Sabha constituency. Since 2008, this assembly constituency is numbered 290 amongst 403 constituencies.

Election results

2022

2017
Bharatiya Janta Party candidate Ram Feran won in 2017 Uttar Pradesh Legislative Elections defeating Samajwadi Party candidate Mohammed Ramzan by a margin of 445 votes.

References

External links
 

Assembly constituencies of Uttar Pradesh
Shravasti